The Central African Athletics Championships are an international athletics competition between countries in Central Africa. First held in 1976, it has been held sporadically since then, with the most recent edition being the ninth championships in 2015.

The competition features mostly outdoor track and field events, though the 1991 championships had a men's marathon and the 1999 championships hosted a men's 20 kilometres race walk. There was also a cross country running championships held in 2000. These competitions were all hosted separately from the Central African Games as well as the East and Central African Championships.

Editions

Participation

Central African Cross Country Championships
In 2000, Bujumbura in Burundi staged the only known edition of a Central African Cross Country Championships. Long and short course races were held for both men and women, with Lambert Ndayikéza (36:29) and Béatrice Iradukunda (28:39) the long course winners and Onèsphore Nkunzimana (12:40) and Épiphanie Nyirabaramé (15:24) being the short course winners. Rwanda's Nyirabarame was the only winner not from the host nation. Burundi and Rwanda are the only nations in the region with an international pedigree in long-distance running.

Champions

Men's 100 metres
1975: 
1978: 
1980: 
1995: 
1996: 
1999:

Men's 200 metres
1975: 
1978: 
1980: 
1995: 
1996: 
1999:

Men's 400 metres
1975: 
1978: 
1980: 
1995: 
1996: 
1999:

Men's 800 metres
1975: 
1978: 
1980: 
1995: 
1996: 
1999:

Men's 1500 metres
1975: 
1978: 
1980: 
1995: 
1996: 
1999:

Men's 5000 metres
1975: 
1978: 
1980: 
1995: 
1996: 
1999:

Men's 10,000 metres
1975: 
1978: 
1980: 
1995: 
1996: 
1999:

Men's marathon
1980:

Men's 3000 metres steeplechase
1975: 
1978: 
1980:

Men's 110 metres hurdles
Abdoulaye Sène of Senegal placed first at the 1995 event as a guest athlete.
1975: 
1978: ?
1980: 
1995: 
1996: Not held
1999:

Men's 400 metres hurdles
1975: 
1978: 
1980: 
1995: 
1996: Not held
1999:

Men's high jump
1975: 
1978: 
1980: 
1995: 
1996: 
1999:

Men's pole vault
1975: 
1978: 
1980:

Men's long jump
Guy Mialou of Senegal placed first at the 1995 event as a guest athlete.
1975: 
1978: 
1980: 
1995: 
1996: 
1999:

Men's triple jump
1975: 
1978: 
1980: 
1995: 
1996: 
1999:

Men's shot put
1975: 
1978: 
1980: 
1995: 
1996: 
1999:

Men's discus throw
1975: 
1978: ?
1980: 
1995: 
1996: 
1999:

Men's javelin throw
1975: 
1978: 
1980: 
1995: 
1996: 
1999:

Men's 20 km walk
1999:

Men's 4 × 100 metres relay
1975: 
1978: 
1980: 
1995: 
1996: 
1999"

Men's 4 × 400 metres relay
1975" 
1978: 
1980: 
1995" 
1996" 
1999:

Women's 100 metres
1975: 
1978: 
1980: 
1995: 
1996: 
1999:

Women's 200 metres
1975: 
1978: 
1980: 
1995: 
1996: 
1999:

Women's 400 metres
1975: 
1978: 
1980: 
1995: 
1996: 
1999:

Women's 800 metres
1975: 
1978: 
1980: 
1995: 
1996: 
1999:

Women's 1500 metres
1975: 
1978: 
1980: 
1995: 
1996: 
1999:

Women's 3000 metres
1980:

Women's 5000 metres
1995: 
1996: 
1999:

Women's 100 metres hurdles
1980: 
1995: 
1996: Not held
1999:

Women's 400 metres hurdles
1999:

Women's high jump
Irène Tiendrébéogo of Burkina Faso placed first at the 1995 event competing as a guest athlete.
1975: 
1978: ?
1980: 
1995: 
1996: 
1999:

Women's long jump
1975: 
1978: 
1980: 
1995: 
1996: 
1999:

Women's triple jump
1995: 
1996: 
1999:

Women's shot put
1975: 
1978: 
1980: 
1995: 
1996: 
1999:

Women's discus throw
1975: 
1978: 
1980: 
1995: 
1996: 
1999:

Women's javelin throw
1975: 
1978: 
1980: 
1995: 
1996: 
1999:

Women's 10,000 metres walk
1999:

Women's 4 × 100 metres relay
1975: 
1978: 
1980: ?
1995: 
1996: 
1999:

Women's 4 × 400 metres relay
1975" 
1978: 
1980: ?
1995: 
1996: 
1999:

References

Athletics competitions in Africa
Sport in Central Africa
Recurring sporting events established in 1976